Megapsyrassa auricomis is a species of beetle in the family Cerambycidae. It was described by Chemsak and Linsley in 1963.

References

Elaphidiini
Beetles described in 1963